Muhammad Syazwan bin Andik Mohd Ishak (born 4 August 1996) is a Malaysian professional footballer who plays as a defender for Malaysia Super League side Sri Pahang, on loan from Johor Darul Ta'zim II and the Malaysia national team.

Club career

Harimau Muda B

Syazwan Andik began his career with Harimau Muda B. Later, he was promoted to the Malaysia national under-22 football team in 2015 under coach Frank Bernhardt.

Johor Darul Ta'zim II
In early 2016, Syazwan joined Johor Darul Ta'zim II.

Kuala Lumpur
On 30 January 2018, Syazwan signed a two-year contract with Malaysia Super League side Kuala Lumpur. He made his side and Malaysia Super League debut on 4 February against Selangor.

Johor Darul Ta'zim 
In 2019, Syazwan's contract with Kuala Lumpur FA was not supposed to be terminated but the Skudai-born decided to leave with a termination of contract as the club failed to settle his salary for over two months in 2018. The termination of contract was permissible as there is a clause in their contracts stating that players can decide to leave and make their own path with other clubs, without having to discuss between clubs, if the current club did not manage to pay for more than a month.

International career
Syazwan made his debut for Malaysia senior team on 1 April 2018 against Bhutan coming off the bench for Mahali Jasuli.

Career statistics

Club

International

International goals
''As of match played 10 September 2018. Malaysia score listed first, score column indicates score after each Syazwan Andik goal.

U23 international goals

Honours

Club
Johor Darul Takzim F.C
 Malaysia Charity Shield:2019

International
Malaysia U-23
Southeast Asian Games
 Silver Medal: 2017

Malaysia
 AFF Championship runners up : 2018

References

External links
 

1996 births
Living people
People from Johor
Malaysian footballers
Malaysian people of Malay descent
Johor Darul Ta'zim F.C. players
Malaysia Super League players
Malaysia international footballers
Association football fullbacks
Southeast Asian Games silver medalists for Malaysia
Southeast Asian Games medalists in football
Footballers at the 2018 Asian Games
Competitors at the 2017 Southeast Asian Games
Asian Games competitors for Malaysia